Wirthlin is a Swiss surname. Notable people with the surname include:

Joseph B. Wirthlin (1917–2008), American businessman and member of the Quorum of the Twelve Apostles of The LDS Church
Joseph L. Wirthlin (1893–1963), the eighth presiding bishop of The LDS Church
LeRoy S. Wirthlin (born 1936), professor at Harvard Medical School and later a practicing surgeon
Richard Wirthlin (1931–2011), prominent American pollster, Ronald Reagan's chief strategist

See also
Wirthlin Worldwide, political and business consulting firm founded by Richard Wirthlin in 1969